The Palazzo della Ragione is a medieval market hall, town hall and palace of justice building in Padua, in the Veneto region of Italy. The upper floor was dedicated to the town and justice administration; while the ground floor still hosts the historical covered market of the city.
The palace separates the two market squares of Piazza delle Erbe from Piazza dei Frutti. It is popularly called "il Salone" (the big Hall).
It is part of the UNESCO World Heritage Site of Padua's 14th-century fresco cycles (since 2021).

Details
The building, with its great hall on the upper floor hence the name "Salone" ("big Hall"), is believed to be one of the largest medieval halls still extant; the hall is nearly rectangular, its length 81.5m, its breadth 27m, and its height 24 m; the walls are covered with allegorical frescoes. The building stands on arches, and the upper storey is surrounded by an open loggia, not unlike that which surrounds the Basilica Palladiana in Vicenza, that was indeed inspired by Padua's Palazzo della Ragione.

The gigantic wooden horse on the western side of the hall was built in 1466 and is modelled on Donatello's Equestrian statue of Gattamelata which is in place in front of the Saint Antony Basilica. On the eastern side there is a contemporary version of a Foucault pendulum.

In the northeast corner of the hall is situated a particular tool: the "Pietra del Vituperio". It is a stool of black stone which was located at the middle of the hall in the Middle Ages and was used to publicly humiliate insolvent debtors, who were obliged to sit there as in the stocks.

The ground floor hosts, since 800 years and likely the oldest in the European Union, the market hall of the city. Originally dedicated to the commerce of a wide selection of food, clothes, spices, and jewels; it is today mostly active in the food and beverage sector.

History
The Palazzo was begun in 1172 and finished in 1219. In 1306, Fra Giovanni, an Augustinian friar, covered the whole with one roof; originally there were three roofs, spanning the three chambers into which the hall was at first divided; the internal partition walls remained until the fire of 1420, when the Venetian architects who undertook the restoration removed them, throwing all three spaces into one and forming the present great hall, the Salone. The new space was frescoed by Nicolò Miretto and Stefano da Ferrara, working from 1425 to 1440. Some of the frescoes depict the astrological theories of Pietro d'Abano, a professor at Padua University in the 13th century. 

A tornado destroyed the roof and damaged the building on 17 August 1756.

The frescoes
In the great hall (il "Salone"), all four walls are entirely occupied by frescoes. The decoration consists of more than three hundred different scenes divided into two sections: the upper area, dating back to the fifteenth century, contains scenes that develop over three levels and shows that each month of the year corresponds to certain signs of the zodiac, trades and character traits. The lower area is less densely decorated and contains parts of the 14th-century frescoes. These are probably connected to the frescoes in the upper zone. Yet it is to consider that they were painted according to the functions of the different spaces in which the hall was divided. For example, there are frescoes separated by traces left by the tribunal benches which once lined the walls, and by symbols associated with them. This is a reminder of the original function of the Palazzo della Ragione: law courts.

On the southern wall is a relief showing a golden sun. At midday, a ray of sunlight passes through its mouth and strikes the floor along a meridan line. This feature was created by Bortolomeo Ferracina in 1761.

References

Buildings and structures completed in 1219
Buildings and structures in Padua
Ragione, Palazzo della